Forces occultes (Occult Forces - subtitled The mysteries of Freemasonry unveiled for the first time on the screen) is a French film of 1943, notable as the last film to be directed by Paul Riche (the pseudonym of Jean Mamy).

Plot 
The film recounts the life of mr Avenel, a young member of parliament who joins the Freemasons in order to relaunch his career.  He thus learns of how the Freemasons are conspiring with the Jews and the Anglo-American nations to encourage France into a war against Germany.

History
The film was commissioned in 1942 by the Propaganda Abteilung, a delegation of Nazi Germany's propaganda ministry within occupied France by the ex-Mason Mamy.  It virulently denounces Freemasonry, parliamentarianism and Jews as part of Vichy's drive against them and seeks to prove a Jewish-Masonic plot.

On France's liberation, its writer Jean Marquès-Rivière, its producer Robert Muzard, and its director Jean Mamy were purged for collaboration with the enemy.  On 25 November 1945, Muzard was condemned to 3 years in prison and Marquès-Rivière was condemned in his absence (he had gone into self-imposed exile) to death and degradation.

Mamy had also been a journalist on L'Appel under Pierre Constantini (leader of the Ligue française d’épuration, d’entraide sociale et de collaboration européenne) and on the collaborationist journal Au pilori, and was thus condemned to death and executed at the fortress of Montrouge on 29 March 1949.

Cast 
 Maurice Rémy as Pierre Avenel 
 Marcel Vibert 
 Auguste Bovério as Bovério 
 Gisèle Parry as Madame Avenel 
 Léonce Corne 
 Pierre Darteuil   
 Marcel Raine
 Louise Flavie 
 Simone Arys
 Colette Darfeuil   
 Henri Valbel

External links 
 
 

1943 films
Anti-Masonry
French collaboration during World War II
Nazi antisemitic propaganda films
1943 drama films
1940s French-language films